Brian Saunderson (born 16 November 1961) is a Canadian politician and formerly a rower. He competed at the 1988 Summer Olympics and the 1992 Summer Olympics.

Political career
In 2018, Saunderson was elected mayor of the town of Collingwood. From 2014-18, he was deputy mayor. As of 2018, he has lived and worked as lawyer in Collingwood for 17 years.

In June 2021, Saunderson was named as the Ontario PC Party's MPP candidate for Simcoe—Grey in the 2022 provincial election. He was selected as the candidate after being recommended by Doug Ford.

References

External links
 

1961 births
Living people
Canadian male rowers
Olympic rowers of Canada
Rowers at the 1988 Summer Olympics
Rowers at the 1992 Summer Olympics
Rowers from Toronto
Mayors of places in Ontario
Sportspeople from Collingwood, Ontario
Canadian sportsperson-politicians
Progressive Conservative Party of Ontario MPPs
21st-century Canadian politicians